Trabáu is one of three parishes (administrative divisions) in the Degaña municipality, within the province and autonomous community of Asturias, in northern Spain.

As of 2015 the population was 32.

References 

Parishes in Degaña